The India national cricket team toured New Zealand from 4 December 2002 to 14 January 2003 and played a two-match test series along with seven-match one-day international series against New Zealand. New Zealand won the test series 2–0 and also won the ODI series 5-2.

Test Matches

1st Test

2nd Test

ODI Series

1st ODI

2nd ODI

3rd ODI

4th ODI

5th ODI

6th ODI

7th ODI

References

External links
 Tour home at ESPN Cricinfo
 

2002 in Indian cricket
2003 in Indian cricket
2002-03
International cricket competitions in 2002–03
2002–03 New Zealand cricket season
2002 in New Zealand cricket
2003 in New Zealand cricket